Kristall Saratov is an ice hockey team in Saratov, Russia. They play in the VHL-B, the third level of Russian ice hockey.

History
The club was founded as Bolshevik Saratov in 1948. They have gone through a number of name changes during their history.

1949: Nauka Saratov
1950: Iskra Saratov
1954: Iskra Saratov folded.
1958: Trud Saratov was founded as the successor to Iskra Saratov.
1961: Avangard Saratov
1965: Energiya Saratov
1969: Kristall Saratov

Achievements
Soviet League Class A2 champion: 1967, 1974, 1976

References

External links
Official site

Ice hockey teams in Russia
Sport in Saratov
Ice hockey clubs established in 1948
1948 establishments in Russia